Víctor Herrera might refer to:

Víctor Herrera (cinematographer), Mexican cinematographer, winner of the Silver Ariel Award for cinematography in 1946
Víctor Herrera (cyclist) (born 1970), Colombian track and road cyclist
Víctor Herrera Piggott (born 1980), Panamanian footballer